Košarkaški klub Alkar, commonly referred to as KK Alkar or simply Alkar, is a men's professional basketball club based in Sinj, Croatia. The club competes in the Croatian League.

History
The club was founded in 1955 under the name Tekstilac. In 1965, the club changed its name to Alkar.

Notable players 
 Stipe Modrić
 Josip Vranković

External links

KK Alkar
Basketball teams in Croatia
Basketball teams in Yugoslavia
Basketball teams established in 1955
1955 establishments in Croatia